Bakken may refer to:

People
Bakken (surname), list of people with this name

Places
Bakken, Agder, a village in Iveland municipality, Agder county, Norway
The Bakken, a medical electricity museum in Minneapolis, Minnesota, US
Dyrehavsbakken, a Danish amusement park referred to informally as Bakken
Bakken formation, a rock unit with producible reserves of oil in North America
Bakken pipeline, an oil pipeline in the US

Other
Bakken Air, an airline based in Bismarck, North Dakota
Bakken Bears, a Danish professional basketball club